Apricia jovialis (syn.: Ocrisiona jovialis), known as the jovial jumper is a small species of jumping spider found in Australia. This dark spider with yellow bands is often seen sheltering on tree bark.

References

Salticidae
Spiders of Australia
Spiders described in 1879